Ram Lallu Vaishya is an Indian politician from the Bhartiya Janata Party. He was elected as the Member of Legislative Assembly of Madhya Pradesh (MLA) from Singrauli constituency in the 2018 polls. He won 4000 approximately votes defeating his immediate rival Renu Shah of Indian National Congress.

References 

Madhya Pradesh MLAs 2013–2018
People from Singrauli district
Living people
Bharatiya Janata Party politicians from Madhya Pradesh
Year of birth missing (living people)